Glapwell is a former railway station in Glapwell, Derbyshire, England.

Context

The station was built by the Midland Railway on the circuitous Barrow Hill to Pleasley West line known as the Doe Lea Branch, because it ran for much of its length along the valley of the River Doe Lea.

History
The line was opened without ceremony on 1 September 1890, but no station was built at Glapwell. Pressure from the residents of Bramley Vale led to one being built and opened on 1 September 1892 as "Glapwell". It initially provided a service of three trains each way between Mansfield and Chesterfield, taking about an hour from end to end.

The line was single track between Seymour Junction and Pleasley West. Accordingly, the station had a single platform and a typical MR country station building, very similar to Clowne and Barlborough and Bolsover Castle.

Normal passenger traffic along the Doe Lea Branch dwindled over the years and finally ceased on 28 July 1930. Glapwell Colliery was still going strong at this time. As its sidings left the passenger line to the North of the station and all coal went out northwards, the station was abandoned along with the track southwards through Rowthorn Tunnel to Pleasley Colliery West Junction a short distance South of Pleasley West. The station building was not destroyed and by the early 1970s was used by an evangelical Christian group.

The last steam train to use the line was an enthusiasts' special on 16 October 1965. This train also traversed the Clowne Branch.

When Glapwell Colliery closed in 1974 the line South of Bolsover Castle station became redundant, though it was not lifted until 1978.

The trackbed south from Bolsover Castle almost to Glapwell at the bottom of Rylah Hill between Palterton and M1 J29 is now a public bridleway known as The Stockley Trail.

References

Sources

Further reading

External links
Glapwell station on old O.S. Map npe Maps
The station on overlain OS maps National Library of Scotland
The station and line on overlain OS maps Rail Map Online
The station, line and mileages Railway Codes
The station's history Old Miner
The station and village Richard's Bygone Times
The station after closure eBay

Disused railway stations in Derbyshire
Former Midland Railway stations
Railway stations in Great Britain opened in 1892
Railway stations in Great Britain closed in 1930